The 2015 Abu Dhabi Tour was a men's cycling stage race, that took place between 8-11 October 2015. It was the inaugural edition of the Abu Dhabi Tour and was part of the 2015 UCI Asia Tour.

The event featured prominent riders, including newly crowned World Champion Peter Sagan in his first race appearance after the Championship race. The Astana team were captained by Vincenzo Nibali, who won the Giro di Lombardia a couple of days prior. He was assisted by Fabio Aru, winner of the Vuelta a España.

Teams
Eighteen teams entered the race. Each team had a maximum of six riders.

United Arab Emirates National Cycling Team

Route and stages

References

External links 
 

Abu Dhabi Tour
Abu Dhabi
2015 in Emirati sport